Sportblitz is the sports television programme of Radio Bremen, the smallest state broadcasting station in the German ARD network. It is broadcast weekdays at 6:06 p.m. (until September 2013 at 7:15 p.m., in former times also at 6:35 p.m.) on Radio Bremen TV, which is unique in the ARD media landscape in terms of frequency. The concept was developed in 1990 by Jörg Wontorra, the station's sports director at the time. From 1990 to 1992, the sportblitz was already being experimented with, with changing broadcast lengths, at that time still in the first programme of the ARD (today's Das Erste), where buten un binnen was also at home. The programme returned on 1 November 1994 at 6:35 p.m. after a two-year break - at the same time when the regional programme of Radio Bremen moved from the first to the third programme.

After one year of planning, the programme was restructured and was given new broadcasting times and a new studio set as of 1 September 2013.

In terms of content, the programme covers sports events in Bremen and Bremerhaven - usually an interview guest is invited. Most topics are Werder Bremen and basketball (Eisbären Bremerhaven)/ice hockey (Fischtown Pinguins Bremerhaven) related.

Hosts
Janna Betten
Jan-Dirk Bruns
Ludwig Evertz
Pascale Ciesla
Stephan Schiffner
Niko Schleicher
Jenny Stadelmann

References

External links
 

1994 German television series debuts
2000s German television series
2010s German television series
German-language television shows
1994 establishments in Germany
Radio Bremen